Rybaczewski may refer to:

 Anna Rybaczewski (* 1982), French female former volleyball player
 Mirosław Rybaczewski (* 1952), Polish volleyball player